The Twelfth season of the Australian police-drama Blue Heelers premiered on the Seven Network on 2 February 2005 and aired on Wednesday nights at 8:30 PM. The 42-episode season concluded Wednesday 16 November 2005 with a double episode.

Casting 
The season also saw the departure of Geoff Morrell and Martin Sacks, who chose to take time off to spend with their families. Sacks's departure left Julie Nihill and John Wood as the only remaining original cast members; and the only cast members to have been on this show since before 2001.

Main cast for this season consisted of:
 John Wood as Senior Sergeant Tom Croydon [full season]
 Julie Nihill as Christine 'Chris' Riley [full season]
 Martin Sacks as Senior Detective Patrick Joseph 'P.J.' Hasham [until Episode 484]
 Ditch Davey as Constable --> Senior Constable/Detective Evan 'Jonesy' Jones [full season]
 Simone McAullay as Constable --> Senior Constable Susie Raynor [full season]
 Rachel Gordon as Senior Detective Amy Fox [full season]
 Samantha Tolj as Constable Kelly O'Rourke [full season]
 Danny Raco as Constable Joss Peroni [full season]
 Charlie Clausen as Leading Senior Constable/Acting Sergeant Alex Kirby [from Episode 461]
 Geoff Morrell as Sergeant Mark Jacobs [until Episode 489]
 Matthew Holmes as Constable Matt Graham [from Episode 490]

Guest actors included Jeremy Lindsay Taylor, Val Jellay, John Brumpton, Joy Westmore, Pepe Trevor, Margot Knight, Tracy Mann, Danny Adcock, Paul Dawber, Lynette Curran, Elspeth Ballantyne, Alethea McGrath. and Michael Falzon,

Reception 

While the first half of the season, with several high-profile guest stars, maintained the high ratings of the previous season; the second half of the year - which saw the show up against ratings success House saw a decrease in ratings, as well as a gradual mixing of critical reaction, which had initially proved mostly positive.

Awards 

2005 Australian Film Institute Awards

Nominee: Best Television Drama Series

2005 Logie Awards

Winner: Most Popular Actor (John Wood)
Nominee: Most Popular Actress (Jane Allsop)
Nominee: Most Popular Personality (John Wood)
Nominee: Most Popular Australian Drama Series
Nominee: Most Popular New Female Talent (Rachel Gordon)
Nominee: Most Popular New Female Talent (Samantha Tolj)

After its revamp in 2004, Blue Heelers actresses Rachel Gordon and Samantha Tolj were both nominated for Most Popular New Female Talent; although neither actually won the award. Blue Heelers veteran, John Wood, won the award for Most Popular Actor.

Episodes

DVD release 
Season Twelve of Blue Heelers was released on Thursday, 4 November 2010

References

General
 Zuk, T. Blue Heelers: 2005 episode guide, Australian Television Information Archive. Retrieved 1 August 2007.
 TV.com editors. Blue Heelers Episode Guide - Season 13, TV.com. Retrieved 1 August 2007.
Specific

Blue Heelers seasons
2005 Australian television seasons